The 1973–74 South Carolina Gamecocks men's basketball team represented the University of South Carolina during the 1973–74 men's college basketball season.

This is Frank McGuire's 10th season as a head coach. They finished the record of 22-5.

Schedule

Team players drafted into the NBA

References 

South Carolina Gamecocks men's basketball seasons
South Carol
South Carol
South Carol
South Carol